Acratus is a genus of primitive weevils in the family of beetles known as Brentidae. There are at least 30 described species in Acratus.

Species
These 34 species belong to the genus Acratus:

 Acratus apicalis Sharp, 1895 i c g
 Acratus armatus Senna, 1897 i c g
 Acratus bechynei Soares, 1970 i c g
 Acratus bellus Soares, 1970 i c g
 Acratus carioca Soares, 1970 i c g
 Acratus diringshofeni Soares, 1970 i c g
 Acratus disjunctus Kleine, 1927 i c g
 Acratus durabilis Kleine, 1927 i c g
 Acratus errabundus Kleine, 1927 i c g
 Acratus expectatus Kleine, 1927 i c g
 Acratus expressus Kleine, 1927 i c g
 Acratus exquisitus Kleine, 1927 i c g
 Acratus extraordinarius Kleine, 1927 i c g
 Acratus extrarius Kleine, 1927 i c g
 Acratus fallax Kleine, 1927 i c g
 Acratus fidelis Kleine, 1927 i c g
 Acratus gracilipes Soares, 1970 i c g
 Acratus interruptolineatus (Gyllenhal, 1833) i c g
 Acratus laevigatus (Boheman, 1840) i c g
 Acratus mendax Soares, 1970 i c g
 Acratus nitidissimus Soares, 1970 i c g
 Acratus plumirostris (Boheman, 1840) i c g
 Acratus pohli Soares, 1970 i c g
 Acratus propinquus Senna, 1890 i c g
 Acratus pseudoarticulatus Soares, 1970 i c g
 Acratus ruber (Erichson, 1847) i c g
 Acratus seabrai Soares and Meyer, 1959 i c g
 Acratus seorsus Soares, 1970 i c g
 Acratus subfasciatus (Boheman, 1840) i c g
 Acratus suratus (Boheman, 1840) i c g
 Acratus suturalis (Lund, 1800) i c g
 Acratus tarsatus (Gyllenhal, 1833) i c g
 Acratus telesi Soares and Meyer, 1959 i c g
 Acratus villens Soares, 1970 i c g

Data sources: i = ITIS, c = Catalogue of Life, g = GBIF, b = Bugguide.net

References

Further reading

 
 
 
 
 
 
 

Brentidae